Gymnopilus parvisporus is a species of mushroom in the family Hymenogastraceae.

See also

List of Gymnopilus species

External links
Gymnopilus parvisporus at Index Fungorum

parvisporus
Fungi of North America